Ian Frederick Naylor (born 1947) was Archdeacon of France from 2013 to 2016.

Naylor was educated at the Open University, Heythrop College London and  St Augustine's College, Canterbury. He was ordained Deacon in 1971 and Priest in 1972. After a curacy at St Giles Camberwell he was with the Order of St Benedict from 1974 to 1986. He was a  Chaplain in the Royal Navy from 1986 to 2004. He then served in Pau and Gibraltar.

Notes

1937 births
Alumni of the Open University
Alumni of Heythrop College
Alumni of St Augustine's College, Canterbury
Archdeacons of France
Living people
20th-century English Anglican priests
21st-century English Anglican priests
English military chaplains